Nai or Biaka is a language of Papua New Guinea.

Nai is one of the Kwomtari languages. However, due to an alignment error in the published data, Nai (as Biaka) was mistakenly placed in a spurious "Baibai" family with the Fas language Baibai; this was then linked back to the Kwomtari family as "Kwomtari–Baibai". (See Kwomtari–Fas languages for details.)

Locations
Ethnologue lists Biaka-speaking villages in Green River Rural LLG, (formerly within Amanab District), Sandaun Province, in three villages: Konabasi, Biaka, and Amini.

Baron (2007) lists Biaka-speaking villages as Konabasi, Biaka, and Amini.

References

 

Languages of Sandaun Province
Kwomtari–Nai languages